Trezza is both a given name and an Italian surname. Notable people with the name include: 

Alex Trezza (born 1980), American college baseball coach
Betty Trezza (1925–2007), American baseball player
Trezza Azzopardi (born 1961), British writer

Italian-language surnames